Herman Preston Faris (December 25, 1858 – March 20, 1936) was an American businessman and politician who served as treasurer of the Prohibition National Committee, twice as the Prohibition Party candidate for governor of Missouri, and was the party's presidential candidate during the 1924 presidential election.

Life

Herman Preston Faris was born on December 25, 1858, in Bellefontaine, Ohio to Samuel D. Faris and Sarah Plumber Finks and his family later moved to Lawrence, Kansas. He later moved to Clinton, Missouri in 1867, he would temporarily leave it for Colorado in the 1870s and returned, where he became a successful banker, but suffered financial difficulties shortly before his death. In 1889 he married Adda Winters and later had five children with her and in 1911 he married Sallie A. Lewis.

In 1884, he left the Republican Party and joined the Prohibition Party and afterwards he became active in electoral politics with his running for secretary of state, governor four times, and senator twice. During the 1920 presidential election he ran for the Prohibition Party's vice presidential nomination, but was defeated by D. Leigh Colvin with 108 delegates to 47 delegates. In 1924, he was given the Prohibition Party's presidential nomination with 82 delegates against A.P. Gouttey's 40 and used the slogan "Be Fair With Faris" and received 55,951 votes. During the 1928 presidential election he supported Herbert Hoover and campaigned for him in Texas due to Al Smith's anti-prohibition stances and had expected the Prohibition Party to give its nomination to Hoover rather than to William F. Varney.

On March 20, 1936, Faris suffered either a heart attack or a stroke before crashing his car off a bridge at age 77.

Electoral history

See also
 Temperance organizations

References

|-

1858 births
1936 deaths
People from Bellefontaine, Ohio
20th-century American politicians
American temperance activists
Missouri Prohibitionists
Missouri Republicans
Prohibition Party (United States) presidential nominees
Candidates in the 1924 United States presidential election
Road incident deaths in Missouri